The Vicar of Dibley is a British television sitcom, created and written by Richard Curtis, and produced by Tiger Aspect Productions for BBC One. It stars Dawn French as Geraldine Granger, the first-ever female vicar assigned to the position in the small Oxfordshire village of Dibley.

 In addition, outside of the series, there have been seven charity specials and four "lockdown" specials.

Series overview

Episodes

Series 1 (1994)

Specials (1996)

Series 2 (1997–1998)

Series 3 - The Seasonal Specials (1999–2000)
The BBC lists the following four episodes as forming Series 3 on its website, whilst the DVD box set lists them simply as "The Seasonal Specials".

A Very Dibley Christmas (2004–05)

A Wholly Holy Happy Ending (2006–07)

Other media

Comic Relief specials
{| class="wikitable plainrowheaders" style="width:98%;"
|-
! style="background:#ffdead" width=5%|No. overall
! style="background:#ffdead" width=40%|Title
! style="background:#ffdead" width=17%|Duration
! style="background:#ffdead" width=17%|Viewers
! style="background:#ffdead" width=20%|Airdate
|-

{{Episode list
 |EpisodeNumber=6
 | Title=The Bishop of Dibley
 | RTitle=
 | Aux1=10 minutes
 | Aux2=
 | OriginalAirDate=
 | ShortSummary= After taking part in the Ice Bucket Challenge (which itself goes awry), Geraldine gets an offer to become Bishop. Confusion on her behalf, however, leaves her last in the running when other, more successful, candidates turn up for the interview process.
Guest starring Richard Ayoade, Annette Crosbie, Maureen Lipman, Emma Watson, Ruth Jones, Jennifer Saunders and Fiona Bruce. The only regular characters to appear are Geraldine, Hugo and Jim.Last appearance of Jim | LineColor=ffdead
}}

|}

For Comic Relief 2021, Dawn French appeared as Geraldine alongside real-life TV vicar Rev Kate Bottley lip-syncing to Juice by Lizzo.

The Vicar of Dibley in Lockdown (2020)
In December 2020, a series of shorter "lockdown" episodes of The Vicar of Dibley'' were broadcast. These were mainly monologues by Geraldine, in the form of COVID-19 lockdown video messages to her congregation, with occasional appearances by Hugo. In a change to pre-2020 episodes, the characters broke the fourth wall speaking directly to the viewer as if they were Dibley residents. These lockdown minis were made, set and shown during the pandemic when churches were closed for many months and congregations across the UK met virtually via methods such as Zoom.

Notes

References

External links
List of The Vicar of Dibley episodes at the British Comedy Guide

Vicar of Dibley
Lists of British sitcom episodes
The Vicar of Dibley